Spirama voluta is a species of moth of the family Erebidae. It is found in the Moluccas of Indonesia.

References

External links

Moths described in 1874
Spirama